Washington is an unincorporated community in Adams County, Mississippi, United States.

History
This area along the Mississippi had long been inhabited by indigenous peoples. At the time of European encounter, the Natchez people controlled much of the area. They were descendants of the earlier Mississippian culture that had built earthwork mounds. European Americans, settling the area after the American Revolution, named the town for George Washington. Some of the original settlers of the area were Colonel Andrew Ellicott, Joseph Calvit and John Foster. 

Washington became the second territorial capital, when the seat of the Mississippi Territory's legislature was moved from Natchez to Washington on February 1, 1802. The Mississippi constitution convention of 1817 met in Washington at the Methodist Meeting House (which was purchased by Jefferson College in 1830). Mississippi's first constitution was written and adopted here, and the state's first legislature convened here in 1817. The preliminary trial of U.S. vice-president Aaron Burr occurred under some nearby oak trees. After Mississippi was admitted to the union in 1817, the legislature met once in Washington, and afterward in Natchez. The capital was officially moved to Jackson in 1822, in keeping with the Act passed by the Assembly on November 28, 1821, which chose to have a more central location for better accessibility to more residents.

Fort Dearborn, located at Washington, was for a time the largest military installation then extant in the United States, with more than 2,000 soldiers stationed there, including such notables as Brigadier General Leonard Covington and future General Winfield Scott. It was established in 1802 to protect the newly relocated capital of the Mississippi Territory.

In 1879, the Jesse James gang robbed two stores in Washington and in Fayette in Jefferson County, Mississippi. The gang absconded with $2,000 cash in the second robbery and took shelter in abandoned cabins on the Kemp Plantation south of St. Joseph, Louisiana. A posse attacked and killed two of the outlaws but failed to capture the entire gang. Jesse James would live another three years until his demise in St. Joseph in northwestern Missouri.

Geography

Architecture
Elizabeth Female Academy, considered to be the first women's college in the state, was established at Washington in 1818. For most of its history, it was a degree-conferring college; it closed in 1845. Clear Creek Baptist Church, erected in 1825 and one of the oldest churches in Mississippi, is located in Washington. 

In 1836, it was the site of a meeting of the Mississippi Baptist Convention, which was reorganized under President Ashley Vaughn of Natchez. The convention, or association, contained 122 churches, 56 clergy, and 4287 members. 

The congregations would have reflected the majority-black population of the area, where most workers on the cotton plantations were slaves. The town also has Washington Methodist Church. These were the two prominent denominations at the time of settlement. Both recruited slaves and accepted blacks as preachers in many locations. Before the American Civil War, both the national Baptist Association and Methodist Church split over the issue of slavery, and southern congregations established separate organizations.

Parks
Washington is the location of Jefferson College, now known as Historic Jefferson College. It is operated as a state historic park and museum by the Mississippi Department of Archives and History. The college was created by an act of the first General Assembly of the Mississippi Territory in 1802 and was named in honor of Thomas Jefferson, then-president of the United States. Although chartered in 1802, it did not open as a school until 1811. 

Operated as a boys' academy, it continued in this capacity (but for a few brief, temporary closures, due to war, fire, remodeling and the like) for the next 153 years. It closed its doors for good in 1964. Jefferson College operated mostly as an all-male, college-preparatory academy. For a period it operated as Jefferson Military College, a military-style boarding school for high-school boys. Jefferson Davis attended Jefferson College as a 10-year-old boy in 1818, when it had the status of a boys' academy. John James Audubon was a teacher there from 1822 to 1823.

Culture 
Scenes of the lost silent Civil War film The Heart of Maryland (1921) were filmed in Washington. Some of John Ford's film The Horse Soldiers (1959), set during the Civil War and starring John Wayne, was filmed here. Portions of Disney's movie The Adventures of Huck Finn (1993) were filmed here and in Natchez.

Notable people
 Thomas Affleck (1812–1868), Scottish-American horticulturist
 Bill Allain (1928–2013), 59th governor of Mississippi, 1984–1988

References

1802 establishments in Mississippi Territory
Former colonial and territorial capitals in the United States
Populated places established in 1802
Mississippi populated places on the Mississippi River
Natchez Trace
Unincorporated communities in Adams County, Mississippi
Unincorporated communities in Mississippi
Unincorporated communities in Natchez micropolitan area